Rebecca Woodgate is a professor at the University of Washington known for her work on ocean circulation in polar regions.

Education and career 
Woodgate has a B.A. from the University of Cambridge (1990) and a Ph.D. from the University of Oxford (1994). Following her Ph.D., she was a postdoctoral researcher at the Alfred Wegener Institute for Polar and Marine Research. In 1999, she moved to the University of Washington and, as of 2022, she is a professor at the University of Washington.

Research 
Woodgate's early research centered on data assimilation in models and currents near Greenland. She has examined physical properties of the water masses in the Arctic Ocean, and the movement of the water masses in the region. Her research also focuses on the flow of freshwater through the Bering Strait and the changes in the water flowing through the Bering Strait over time. Woodgate's research also informs understanding of the role of freshwater in the Arctic, and the interactions between the Arctic Ocean and sea ice in the region. Her research uses moored instruments to observe conditions in the Arctic Ocean.

Selected publications

References 

Alumni of the University of Cambridge
Alumni of the University of Oxford
University of Washington faculty
Living people
Women oceanographers
Women climatologists
Year of birth missing (living people)